Nicaragua competed at the 2020 Summer Paralympics in Tokyo, Japan, from 24 August to 5 September 2021.

Athletics

See also 

 Nicaragua at the 2020 Summer Olympics

References 

2021 in Nicaraguan sport
Nations at the 2020 Summer Paralympics